Secotium is a genus of fungi in the family Agaricaceae. The members of this genus are closely related to ordinary Agaricus mushrooms, but do not open out in the usual way; this has given rise to the term "secotioid" for such mushrooms in general.  They are thought to form an evolutionary link between agarics and gasteroid fungi (whose spores are enclosed in a pouch-like structure). Secotium is a  widespread genus, with species that are predominantly found in warm and arid regions.

Species

The secotioid species Agaricus deserticola used to be named Secotium texense before its strong connection to Agaricus caused it to be reclassified.

See also
List of Agaricaceae genera

References

External links

Agaricaceae
Agaricales genera